Rhonda K. Wood (born December 10, 1969) is an American lawyer and judge, who is an associate justice of the Arkansas Supreme Court. She previously served as a judge on the Arkansas Court of Appeals from 2013 to 2014, and as a trial court judge for the Arkansas 20th Judicial Circuit from 2007 to 2012.

Early life and education
Wood was born in Iowa in 1969. She moved to Arkansas in 1994 to study at Hendrix College in Conway, where she completed a Bachelor of Arts degree with a major in political science in 1996. She completed a Juris Doctor at the University of Arkansas at Little Rock William H. Bowen School of Law in 1999.

Career 
After graduating, Wood started her own law practice in Conway, which was eventually bought out by another law firm, Williams & Anderson of Little Rock. She specialized in appellate law, health law, and business law. Wood also worked as an assistant dean at the Bowen School of Law at UALR from 2002 to 2006.

Wood co-hosts the podcast Lady Justice: Women of the Court with Chief Justice Bridget McCormack of Michigan, Justice Beth Walker of West Virginia to discuss state courts, the law and its real-world implications.

Judicial service 
In 2006, the Governor Mike Huckabee appointed Wood as a trial court judge, serving on the Arkansas 20th Judicial Circuit Court, which covers three counties: Faulkner, Searcy, and Van Buren. She was re-elected to a six-year term on this court in 2008.

In 2010, Wood challenged incumbent Josephine L. Hart for a seat on the Arkansas Court of Appeals for district 2. Wood was defeated, receiving 48% of the vote, compared to 52% for Hart. In 2012, Wood ran again for a seat on the Arkansas Court of Appeals, and this time she won, defeating Mitch Cash and winning 63% of the vote.

In 2014, Wood ran for a seat on the Arkansas Supreme Court for position 7, and was elected unopposed. Her eight-year term on the court expires in January 2023, and she is eligible to run for re-election in November 2022.

References

1969 births
Living people
Arkansas lawyers
Arkansas state court judges
Justices of the Arkansas Supreme Court
Hendrix College alumni
William H. Bowen School of Law alumni
University of Arkansas at Little Rock alumni
21st-century American judges
American women lawyers
21st-century American women judges